USRN may stand for: 

 United Stations Radio Networks
 Unique Street Reference Number
 Nefteyugansk Airport, whose ICAO airport code is USRN